Loja Club Deportivo is a Spanish football team based in Loja, Granada, in the autonomous community of Andalusia. Founded in 1968 it currently plays in Tercera División – Group 9, holding home matches at Estadio Medina Lauxa, with a 1,250-seat capacity.

Season to season

1 season in Segunda División B
24 seasons in Tercera División

References

External links
Official website 
Futbolme team profile 

Football clubs in Andalusia
Association football clubs established in 1968
1968 establishments in Spain
Province of Granada